Jordan Hamilton may refer to:

Jordan Hamilton (basketball) (born 1990), American basketball player
Jordan Hamilton (soccer) (born 1996), Canadian soccer player

See also
Hamilton Jordan (1944–2018), American politician